The Red Pony is a 1973 American made-for-television drama western film directed and co-written by Robert Totten, based on the 1937 novel The Red Pony by John Steinbeck.  The film features Henry Fonda, Maureen O'Hara, Ben Johnson and Jack Elam.

Premise
A young boy, played by  Clint Howard, becomes very attached to a newborn colt.

Cast
 Henry Fonda as Carl Tiflin
 Maureen O'Hara as Ruth Tiflin
 Ben Johnson as Jess Taylor
 Jack Elam as Granddad
 Clint Howard as Jody Tiflin
 Julian Rivero as Gitano
 Roy Jenson as Toby
 Lieux Dressler as Dearie
 Richard Jaeckel as James Creighton
 Woody Chambliss as Orville Frye
 Link Wyler as Sonny Frye
 Warren Douglas as Barton
 Rance Howard as Sheriff Bill Smith

Awards
Wins
 Emmy Award: Outstanding Achievement in Film Sound Editing - David Marshall (sound editor), Fred J. Brown (sound editor), Ross Taylor (sound editor) - National Broadcasting Company; 1973.
 Emmy Award: Outstanding Achievement in Music Composition - Jerry Goldsmith - NBC; 1973.

See also
 List of American films of 1973

References

External links
 
 

1973 television films
1973 films
1970 drama films
1970 films
American coming-of-age films
Films about horses
Films based on American novels
Films based on works by John Steinbeck
Films set in the 1940s
Films shot in California
Films directed by Robert Totten
Films scored by Jerry Goldsmith
NBC network original films
1970s English-language films
1970s American films